Jeff Romfo (born February 9, 1974) is an American former professional ice hockey and roller hockey right winger.

Romfo was drafted 226th overall by the Minnesota North Stars in the 1992 NHL Entry Draft from Blaine High School. He then spent four seasons with the University of Minnesota–Duluth Bulldogs before turning professional in 1996, spending four seasons with the South Carolina Stingrays of the East Coast Hockey League. He also played three games in the American Hockey League for the South Carolina Stingrays during the 1998–99 AHL season

Romfo also played two seasons in Roller Hockey International, playing the 1996 season with the Minnesota Arctic Blast and the 1999 season with the Minnesota Blue Ox.

Career statistics

References

External links

1974 births
Living people
American men's ice hockey right wingers
Ice hockey people from Saint Paul, Minnesota
Lowell Lock Monsters players
Minnesota Arctic Blast players
Minnesota Blue Ox players
Minnesota Duluth Bulldogs men's ice hockey players
Minnesota North Stars draft picks
South Carolina Stingrays players